Electra Independent School District is a public school district based in Electra, Texas, United States.  In 2007 and 2009, the district received a rating of "academically acceptable" from the Texas Education Agency.

Schools
Electra High School (grades7-12)
Elementary/Electra Junior High School (prekindergarten grade 6)

References

External links
 

School districts in Wichita County, Texas